Supermarket Sweep is an Australian version of the American game show of the same name. It was produced by Grundy Television, airing on the Nine Network from 1992–1994 with former Price Is Right host Ian Turpie as MC, assisted by Tania Zaetta. Col Mooney and Alan Glover served as announcers.
 
The supermarket on this show was originally a Coles Supermarket, but was later changed to a generic supermarket. The latter set was identical to the American show, as was the case with most Reg Grundy-produced Australian games based on American programs.
 
Pairs of contestants, randomly selected from the studio audience, started with one minute and are asked questions about television commercials and supermarket merchandise, with correct answers increasing their allocated time in a "shopping spree." Contestants use their allocated time to run through the mock supermarket, filling their trolleys with as much merchandise as possible. The team with the highest value of merchandise is deemed the winning team, and plays in a treasure hunt-style bonus game, in which clues suggest which four products must be found in 60 seconds. Each marked product found won a prize and finding the fourth product before 60 seconds expired won a major prize.

External links
 

Nine Network original programming
1990s Australian game shows
1992 Australian television series debuts
1994 Australian television series endings
Television series by Fremantle (company)
Television series by Reg Grundy Productions
Australian television series based on American television series